Philip or Phil Gilbert may refer to:

Philip Gilbert (1931–2004), Canadian actor
Phil Gilbert (born 1969), Australian rules footballer
Phil Gilbert (English footballer) (born 1944), English footballer
Philip H. Gilbert (1870–1932), Louisiana politician
Philippe Gilbert (born 1982), Belgian bicyclist
Phil Gilbert (The Inbetweeners), fictional character